Gary Ray Holt (born January 1, 1952) is a Canadian retired professional ice hockey forward who played 101 games in the National Hockey League for the St. Louis Blues, Cleveland Barons and California Golden Seals. Holt now resides in Spokane, Washington.

Born in Sarnia, Ontario, Holt is the older brother of former NHL defenseman Randy Holt.

Career statistics

Regular season and playoffs

References

External links

1952 births
Living people
California Golden Seals players
Canadian expatriate ice hockey players in the United States
Canadian ice hockey forwards
Cleveland Barons (NHL) players
Ice hockey people from Ontario
Port Huron Wings players
St. Louis Blues players
Salt Lake Golden Eagles (CHL) players
Salt Lake Golden Eagles (WHL) players
Sportspeople from Sarnia
Undrafted National Hockey League players